Parada de Rubiales is a village and municipality in the province of Salamanca,  western Spain, part of the autonomous community of Castile-Leon.

Geography

The postal code is 37419.

Economy
The basis of the economy is agriculture.

Culture
The festival of San Blas - 3 February
The festival of San Quirico - 16 June

San Blas
It is a celebration held on February 3, with reference to San Blas. This party, is shorter than San Quirico.

San Quirico
This festival, held on June 16 and attracts many people, refers to the patron San Quirico. The festival, to be in the summer, the heat received from many people, and people, increasing its total number of people these days.

See also
List of municipalities in Salamanca

References

Municipalities in the Province of Salamanca